Cycle Sport was a cycling magazine published 13 times a year by IPC Media. The magazine was first published in June 1993. It was edited by Robert Garbutt. In July 2016, it was announced that the magazine was to closed down, with the final issue being September 2016. The magazine and Cycling Active were incorporated into Cycling Weekly, which is also published by the same company.

References

External links
 

1993 establishments in the United Kingdom
2016 disestablishments in the United Kingdom
Defunct magazines published in the United Kingdom
Cycling magazines published in the United Kingdom
English-language magazines
Magazines established in 1993
Magazines disestablished in 2016
Monthly magazines published in the United Kingdom
Sports magazines published in the United Kingdom